A total solar eclipse will occur on Friday, November 14, 2031. It is a hybrid event, with portions of its central path near sunrise and sunset as an annular eclipse. A solar eclipse occurs when the Moon passes between Earth and the Sun, thereby totally or partly obscuring the image of the Sun for a viewer on Earth. A total solar eclipse occurs when the Moon's apparent diameter is larger than the Sun's, blocking all direct sunlight, turning day into darkness. Totality occurs in a narrow path across Earth's surface, with the partial solar eclipse visible over a surrounding region thousands of kilometres wide.

Images 
Animated path

Related eclipses

Solar eclipses 2029–2032

Saros 143

Metonic series

References

External links 

2031 11 14
2031 11 14
2031 11 14
2031 in science